The Sandy Post is a publication of the Pamplin Media Group, which produces a weekly newspaper and daily online content, published in Sandy, Oregon, United States. It serves the communities of Sandy, Boring, the Villages at Mount Hood and the surrounding areas.

The paper was founded in 1937. Walter C. Taylor Jr. bought the paper, along with the nearby Gresham Outlook and several other Oregon papers, in the early 1960s.

The newspaper is owned by Community Newspapers/Pamplin Media Group, a company of Robert B. Pamplin, Jr. Pamplin acquired the Post from Lee Enterprises (Davenport, Iowa) in 2000.  the publisher was Claudia Stewart.  the paper is published in print on Wednesdays, online daily, and has a circulation of around 3,800.

The newspaper is the primary newspaper published in Sandy and the special districts in the Mount Hood Corridor between Boring and Government Camp.

Steve Brown is the newspaper's current publisher and executive editor. Brittany Allen covers the city of Sandy government, Clackamas County government, business news, news features and crime news in Boring, Sandy and the Mount Hood communities and provides breaking news. In 2019 the Post won the General Excellence award for weekly newspapers from the Oregon Newspaper Publishers Association.

References

External links
Sandy Post web site

1938 establishments in Oregon
Clackamas County, Oregon
Newspapers published by Pamplin Media Group
Oregon Newspaper Publishers Association
Newspapers established in 1938